The Society for the Study of Social Problems  (SSSP) is an organization founded in 1951 in counterpoint to the American Sociological Association.

History 
The Society was founded in 1951 by Elizabeth Briant Lee and Alfred McClung Lee. Professor of Sociology Julia Catherine Wrigley writes that the Society's founders were "liberal and left-leaning academics" and that it provided a "meeting ground for those dismayed by the often conservative thrust of the [American Sociological Organization]".

In the 1950s and 1960s the Society was closely associated with labelling theory.

Purpose
The SSSP's stated purpose is to promote and protect sociological research and teaching on significant problems of social life and, particularly, to encourage the work of young sociologists; to stimulate the application of scientific method and theory to the study of vital social problems; to encourage problem-centered social research; to foster cooperative relations among persons and organizations engaged in the application of scientific sociological findings to the formulation of social policies; to foster higher quality of life, social welfare, and positive social relations in society and the global community and to undertake activities to accomplish these goals.

Activities
The SSSP promotes dialogue through presentations at the annual meeting, and through listservs and division newsletters throughout the year; publishes research in the journal Social Problems; presents awards to community groups; supports undergraduate and graduate students, young scholars and activists with professional support, leadership opportunities, and scholarships; passes and acts upon public resolutions; and fosters the generation of new ideas.

Membership
Membership is open to individuals and university and college departments who support the SSSP's goals.

Publications
Social Problems, the official quarterly journal of the Society, is published through Oxford University Press. The Society also publishes various newsletters and booklets.

References

Further reading

 Additional information about the SSSP can be found in Marginality and Dissent in Twentieth-Century American Sociology: The Case of Elizabeth Briant Lee and Alfred McClung Lee by John F. Galliher and James M. Galliher, 1995, SUNY Press.
 Additional information about Elizabeth Briant Lee and Alfred McClung Lee, SSSP founders, can be found courtesy of Harvard Square Library at http://www.harvardsquarelibrary.org/biographies/alfred-mcclung-and-elizabeth-briant-lee/.

External links

1951 establishments in the United States
Learned societies of the United States
Organizations based in Knoxville, Tennessee
Social issues
Sociological organizations